Women's European Individual Chess Championship 2017 was a Swiss-system tournament in Riga, to decide the women's European individual chess champion. The title was won by Nana Dzagnidze of Georgia for the first time.

Tournament 
At the European Chess Union (ECU) General Assembly during the 42nd Chess Olympiad in Baku in September 2016, the organizational rights to the 18th Individual European Chess Championship for women were awarded to Latvia, who held the event in Riga from 10 to 22 April 2017, under the auspices of European Chess Union. The venue for the championship was the hotel "Radisson Blu Hotel Latvia" (Riga, Elizabetes Street 55) in the center of Riga. The main organizers from Latvia were the President of the Latvian Chess Federation Āris Ozoliņs and tournament director Egons Lavendelis. The chief arbiter of the tournament was Ashot Vardapetyan (Armenia). The tournament was held on Swiss-system in 11 rounds with time control for each player: 90 minutes for 40 moves plus 30 minutes for the rest of the game with an increment of 30 seconds per move, starting from move one. The prize money is 70.000 euro for first, which was distributed among the participants who took the first 20 places (1st place - 12.000 euros, 2nd place - 10.000 euros, 3rd place - 8.000 euros ... 20th place - 1000 euros). 144 chess players from 33 countries took part in the tournament. In connection with the exclusion of the chess federation of Bulgaria from FIDE, all participants from Bulgaria represented the European Chess Union at the tournament. The 18th Individual European Chess Championship for women was qualification event for the next World Women Championship. According to FIDE regulations and the decision of the ECU Board, 14 players qualified for Women's World Chess Championship 2018. Nana Dzagnidze took clear first place with 8½ from 11 half a point clear of Aleksandra Goryachkina and Alisa Galliamova.

Tournament table 
{| class="wikitable" style="text-align: left"
|+ Women's European Individual Chess Championship 2017 (Riga, 11.04.2017-22.04.2017)
|-
! Place !! Name !! Rating !! 1 !! 2 !! 3 !! 4 !! 5 !! 6 !! 7 !! 8 !! 9 !! 10 !! 11 !! Points !! TB1 !! TB2 !! TB3 !! Rp
|-
| 1. || align=left |  || 2528 || 83b1 || 42w1 || 34b1 || 26w½ || 47b½ || 28w1 || 2b½ || 7w1 || 5b½ || 6w1 || 12b½ || 8½ || 0 || 70 || 75,5 || 2646
|-
| 2. || align=left |  || 2452 || 32b1 || 88w½ || 73b1 || 66w1 || 65b1 || 4w½ || 1w½ || 19b1 || 16w½ || 13b½ || 8w½ || 8 || 0 || 68 || 73 || 2576
|-
| 3. || align=left |  || 2444 || 59b1 || 116w1 || 48b½ || 65w0 || 54b1 || 70w½ || 66b½ || 29w1 || 9b½ || 47w1 || 16b1 || 8 || 0 || 61,5 || 66 || 2529
|-
| 4. || align=left |  || 2543 || 38w1 || 17b½ || 35w1 || 22b½ || 52w1 || 2b½ || 11w½ || 16b0 || 27w1 || 37b1 || 14w½ || 7½ || 0 || 70 || 76 || 2506
|-
| 5. || align=left |  || 2546 || 76b1 || 53w1 || 22b½ || 92w1 || 28b½ || 7w½ || 10b½ || 50w1 || 1w½ || 16b½ || 15w½ || 7½ || 0 || 69 || 74 || 2547
|-
| 6. || align=left |  || 2462 || 84w1 || 65b0 || 83w1 || 17b1 || 22w½ || 37b1 || 16w½ || 23b1 || 13w½ || 1b0 || 41w1 || 7½ || 0 || 68 || 73,5 || 2505
|-
| 7. || align=left |  || 2437 || 101w½ || 90b1 || 30w1 || 69b½ || 25w1 || 5b½ || 20w1 || 1b0 || 49w1 || 8b½ || 13w½ || 7½ || 0 || 68 || 73 || 2528
|-
| 8. || align=left |  || 2454 || 63b1 || 25w1 || 66b½ || 77w½ || 36b1 || 47w½ || 26b½ || 9w½ || 19b1 || 7w½ || 2b½ || 7½ || 0 || 67,5 || 73 || 2531
|-
| 9. || align=left |  || 2395 || 87w0 || 118b1 || 56w1 || 39b1 || 20w½ || 49b½ || 14w1 || 8b½ || 3w½ || 43b1 || 11w½ || 7½ || 0 || 67,5 || 71,5 || 2479
|-
| 10. || align=left |  || 2445 || 56w1 || 97b½ || 58w1 || 29b½ || 69w1 || 11b½ ||  5w½ || 49b½ || 17w½ || 41b½ || 38w1 || 7½ || 0 || 65 || 70 || 2487
|-
| 11. || align=left |  || 2438 || 75b1 || 54w1 || 65b½ || 27w½ || 77b1 || 10w½ || 4b½ || 26w½ || 47b½ || 48w1 || 9b½ || 7½ || 0 || 64,5 || 70 || 2520
|-
| 12. || align=left |  || 2478 || 68w½ || 96b1 || 60w1 || 47b0 || 27w½ || 69b½ || 58w1 || 35b½ || 34w1 || 17b1 || 1w½ || 7½ || 0 || 64 || 69 || 2476
|-
| 13. || align=left |  || 2459 || 86b½ || 67w½ || 81b1 || 89w1 || 33b½ || 92w1 || 47b½ || 28w1 ||  6b½ || 2w½ || 7b½ || 7½ || 0 || 63 || 68 || 2500
|-
| 14. || align=left |  || 2354 || 137b½ || 119w1 || 31b½ || 67w1 || 50b½ || 21w½ || 9b0 || 105w1 || 28b1 || 26w1 || 4b½ || 7½ || 0 || 62,5 || 67 || 2482
|-
| 15. || align=left |  || 2416 || 51b½ || 109w½ || 32b½ || 86w1 || 48b1 || 66w½ || 29b½ || 36w½ || 65b1 || 39w1 || 5b½ || 7½ || 0 || 61,5 || 66 || 2453
|-
| 16. || align=left |  || 2426 || 71w0 || 110b1 || 84w1 || 94b½ || 58w1 || 68b1 || 6b½ || 4w1 || 2b½ || 5w½ || 3w0 || 7 || 0 || 66 || 70,5 || 2455
|-
| 17. || align=left |  || 2348 || 132b1 || 4w½ || 18b½ || 6w0 || 51b1 || 106w½ || 31b1 || 74w1 || 10b½ || 12w0 || 47b1 || 7 || 0 || 65,5 || 69 || 2455
|-
| 18. || align=left |  || 2456 || 55w1 || 30b½ || 17w½ || 45b1 || 29w½ || 33b1 || 19w0 || 27b0 || 73w1 || 35b½ || 60w1 || 7 || 0 || 65 || 70,5 || 2436
|-
| 19. || align=left |  || 2411 || 99w0 || 100b1 || 102w1 || 62b1 || 26b½ || 65w1 || 18b1 || 2w0 || 8w0 || 49b1 || 43w½ || 7 || 0 || 63 || 68 || 2465
|-
| 20. || align=left |  || 2470 || 67b½ || 79w1 || 88b1 || 33w½ || 9b½ || 74w1 || 7b0 || 47w½ || 53b½ || 70w1 || 24b½ || 7 || 0 || 62,5 || 67,5 || 2450
|-
| 21. || align=left |  || 2452 || 96w½ || 68b½ || 72w½ || 38b1 || 95w1 || 14b½ || 27w½ || 30b½ || 35w½ || 57b1 || 23w½ || 7 || 0 || 62,5 || 67,5 || 2419
|-
| 22. || align=left |  || 2398 || 126w1 || 39b1 || 5w½ || 4w½ || 6b½ || 26w0 || 65b½ || 69b½ || 97w½ || 89w1 || 48b1 || 7 || 0 || 62,5 || 66,5 || 2481
|-
| 23. || align=left |  || 2413 || 85b½ || 51w0 || 112b1 || 96w1 || 76b1 || 29w½ || 42b1 || 6w0 || 36b½ || 53w1 || 21b½ || 7 || 0 || 62 || 66,5 || 2411
|-
| 24. || align=left |  || 2414 || 117w½ || 98b0 || 111w1 || 55b½ || 56w1 || 72b½ || 30w0 || 68b1 || 69w1 || 27b1 || 20w½ || 7 || 0 || 58,5 || 63 || 2355
|-
| 25. || align=left |  || 2348 || 131w1 || 8b0 || 109w1 || 31w1 || 7b0 || 87b0 || 56w0 || 123b1 || 102w1 || 59b1 || 52w1 || 7 || 0 || 58 || 61,5 || 2381
|-
| 26. || align=left |  || 2587 || 41w1 || 60b½ || 44w1 || 1b½ || 19w½ || 22b1 || 8w½ || 11b½ || 37w½ || 14b0 || 35w½ || 6½ || 0 || 71 || 77 || 2458
|-
| 27. || align=left |  || 2287 || 136b1 || 80w1 || 28w½ || 11b½ || 12b½ || 50w½ || 21b½ || 18w1 || 4b0 || 24w0 || 70b1 || 6½ || 0 || 67 || 70 || 2426
|-
| 28. || align=left |  || 2429 || 123b1 || 89w1 || 27b½ || 48w1 || 5w½ || 1b0 || 87w1 || 13b0 || 14w0 || 65b½ || 73w1 || 6½ || 0 || 64,5 || 68,5 || 2414
|-
| 29. || align=left |  || 2373 || 111w½ || 120b1 || 87w1 || 10w½ || 18b½ || 23b½ || 15w½ || 3b0 || 59w½ || 67b1 || 46w½ || 6½ || 0 || 64,5 || 68,5 || 2368
|-
| 30. || align=left |  || 2314 || 140b1 || 18w½ || 7b0 || 79w1 || 74b0 || 75w1 || 24b1 || 21w½ || 50b½ || 31w½ || 33b½ || 6½ || 0 || 64 || 66,5 || 2385
|-
| 31. || align=left |  || 2527 || 72w1 || 58b½ || 14w½ || 25b0 || 84w1 || 89b½ || 17w0 || 83b1 || 54w1 || 30b½ || 44w½ || 6½ || 0 || 63 || 68 || 2381
|-
| 32. || align=left |  || 2241 || 2w0 || 133b1 || 15w½ || 61b1 || 40w½ || 52b½ || 33w½ || 57b½ || 70b0 || 88w1 || 66b1 || 6½ || 0 || 62,5 || 66 || 2405
|-
| 33. || align=left |  || 2382 || 115w1 || 71b½ || 99w1 || 20b½ || 13w½ || 18w0 || 32b½ || 72b1 || 41w0 || 97b1 || 30w½ || 6½ || 0 || 62 || 66,5 || 2363
|-
| 34. || align=left |  || 2378 || 122b1 || 94w1 || 1w0 || 41b½ || 68w0 || 38b1 || 71w½ || 67b1 || 12b0 || 51w½ || 65w1 || 6½ || 0 || 62 || 66 || 2356
|-
| 35. || align=left |  || 2357 || 119b½ || 108w1 || 4b0 || 90w½ || 59b1 || 105w½ || 106b1 || 12w½ || 21b½ || 18w½ || 26b½ || 6½ || 0 || 60 || 64,5 || 2354
|-
| 36. || align=left |  || 2355 || 120w½ || 104b½ || 123w1 || 98b1 || 8w0 || 71b½ || 68w1 || 15b½ || 23w½ || 46b½ || 40w½ || 6½ || 0 || 60 || 64 || 2346
|-
| 37. || align=left |  || 2394 || 130b½ || 93w0 || 82b1 || 91w1 || 75b1 || 6w0 || 73b1 || 66w1 || 26b½ || 4w0 || 45b½ || 6½ || 0 || 60 || 63,5 || 2375
|-
| 38. || align=left |  || 2271 || 4b0 || 121w1 || 79b½ || 21w0 || 108b1 || 34w0 || 98b1 || 106w1 || 74b1 || 50w1 || 10b0 || 6½ || 0 || 59,5 || 63,5 || 2335
|-
| 39. || align=left |  || 2282 || 144b1 || 22w0 || 105b1 || 9w0 || 131b1 || 78w½ || 57w½ || 61b1 || 52w1 || 15b0 || 49w½ || 6½ || 0 || 59,5 || 60 || 2305
|-
| 40. || align=left |  || 2400 || 107b½ || 85w1 || 45b½ || 76w½ || 32b½ || 73w½ || 54b½ || 89w1 || 48b0 || 62w1 || 36b½ || 6½ || 0 || 59 || 63,5 || 2350
|-
| 41. || align=left |  || 2275 || 26b0 || 122w1 || 130b1 || 34w½ || 70b0 || 61b½ || 123w1 || 92w1 || 33b1 || 10w½ || 6b0 || 6½ || 0 || 59 || 62,5 || 2415
|-
| 42. || align=left |  || 2359 || 118w1 || 1b0 || 101w1 || 107b½ || 71w½ || 90b1 || 23w0 || 87b1 || 43w0 || 55b½ || 72w1 || 6½ || 0 || 58,5 || 62,5 || 2332
|-
| 43. || align=left |  || 2446 || 91b½ || 86w½ || 67b0 || 130w1 || 106b½ || 94w1 || 48b½ || 88w1 || 42b1 || 9w0 || 19b½ || 6½ || 0 || 57 || 60,5 || 2338
|-
| 44. || align=left |  || 2362 || 108b½ || 82w1 || 26b0 || 75w0 || 112b1 || 67w½ || 51b0 || 93w1 || 86b1 || 81w1 || 31b½ || 6½ || 0 || 55,5 || 60 || 2313
|-
| 45. || align=left |  || 2292 || 135w1 || 52b½ || 40w½ || 18w0 || 105b0 || 115b1 || 101w½ || 90b½ || 87w1 || 78b1 || 37w½ || 6½ || 0 || 55,5 || 59 || 2290
|-
| 46. || align=left |  || 2425 || 109b½ || 91w½ || 86b0 || 115w1 || 67b½ || 62w1 || 88b½ || 54w½ || 94b1 || 36w½ || 29b½ || 6½ || 0 || 55 || 59,5 || 2340
|-
| 47. || align=left |  || 2395 || 105b1 || 73w½ || 51b1 || 12w1 || 1w½ ||  8b½ || 13w½ || 20b½ || 11w½ ||  3b0 || 17w0 || 6 || 0 || 72 || 76,5 || 2425
|-
| 48. || align=left |  || 2354 || 129w1 || 49b1 || 3w½ || 28b0 || 15w0 || 64b1 || 43w½ || 71b1 || 40w1 || 11b0 || 22w0 || 6 || 0 || 67 || 71 || 2393
|-
| 49. || align=left |  || 2496 || 81b1 || 48w0 || 93b1 || 54w½ || 88b1 || 9w½ || 70b1 || 10w½ || 7b0 || 19w0 || 39b½ || 6 || 0 || 64 || 69 || 2380
|-
| 50. || align=left |  || 2449 || 102w1 || 69b½ || 95w1 || 52b½ || 14w½ || 27b½ || 55w1 || 5b0 || 30w½ || 38b0 || 54w½ || 6 || 0 || 63 || 68 || 2363
|-
| 51. || align=left |  || 2211 || 15w½ || 23b1 || 47w0 || 60b½ || 17w0 || 133b1 || 44w1 || 52b0 || 114w1 || 34b½ || 57w½ || 6 || 0 || 63 || 66,5 || 2366
|-
| 52. || align=left |  || 2381 || 112b1 || 45w½ || 106b1 || 50w½ ||  4b0 || 32w½ || 105b½ || 51w1 || 39b0 || 76w1 || 25b0 || 6 || 0 || 60,5 || 65 || 2295
|-
| 53. || align=left |  || 2367 || 100w1 || 5b0 || 64w½ || 71b0 || 113w1 || 107b1 || 72w½ || 56b1 || 20w½ || 23b0 || 55w½ || 6 || 0 || 60 || 64,5 || 2304
|-
| 54. || align=left |  || 2324 || 133w1 || 11b0 || 126w1 || 49b½ || 3w0 || 118b1 || 40w½ || 46b½ || 31b0 || 91w1 || 50b½ || 6 || 0 || 60 || 63,5 || 2351
|-
| 55. || align=left |  || 2252 || 18b0 || 138w1 || 78b½ || 24w½ || 80b1 || 77w1 || 50b0 || 70w½ || 66b½ || 42w½ || 53b½ || 6 || 0 || 60 || 63 || 2392
|-
| 56. || align=left |  || 2230 || 10b0 || 140w1 || 9b0 || 124w1 || 24b0 || 111w1 || 25b1 || 53w0 || 88b½ || 95w1 || 80b½ || 6 || 0 || 59 || 61,5 || 2298
|-
| 57. || align=left |  || 2387 || 82b½ || 130w½ || 75b½ || 59w½ || 86b½ || 76w1 || 39b½ || 32w½ || 91b1 || 21w0 || 51b½ || 6 || 0 || 58,5 || 62 || 2276
|-
| 58. || align=left |  || 2325 || 138b1 || 31w½ || 10b0 || 93w1 || 16b0 || 91w1 || 12b0 || 75w0 || 130b1 || 94w½ || 86b1 || 6 || 0 || 57,5 || 60,5 || 2312
|-
| 59. || align=left |  || 2229 || 3w0 || 139b½ || 120w1 || 57b½ || 35w0 || 100b½ || 118w1 || 95b1 || 29b½ || 25w0 || 89b1 || 6 || 0 || 57 || 60 || 2260
|-
| 60. || align=left |  || 2352 || 124b1 || 26w½ || 12b0 || 51w½ || 90b0 || 98w½ || 93b½ || 122w1 || 105b1 || 63w1 || 18b0 || 6 || 0 || 56,5 || 60,5 || 2282
|-
| 61. || align=left |  || 2397 || 93b½ || 107w½ || 91b½ || 32w0 || 85b1 || 41w½ || 86b1 || 39w0 || 63b0 || 105w1 || 99b1 || 6 || 0 || 55,5 || 60 || 2254
|-
| 62. || align=left |  || 2287 || 143w1 || 66b0 || 113w1 || 19w0 || 110b½ || 46b0 || 104w½ || 111b1 || 82w1 || 40b0 || 90w1 || 6 || 0 || 54,5 || 56,5 || 2185
|-
| 63. || align=left |  || 2249 || 8w0 || 103b0 || 133w0 || 135b1 || 100w0 || 142b1 || 125w1 || 113b1 || 61w1 || 60b0 || 97w1 || 6 || 0 || 50 || 52,5 || 2104
|-
| 64. || align=left |  || 2229 || 80b0 || 127w1 || 53b½ || 74w0 || 132b1 || 48w0 || 130b0 || 103w1 || 108b½ || 122w1 || 94b1 || 6 || 0 || 49 || 52,5 || 2182
|-
| 65. || align=left |  || 2322 || 142b1 || 6w1 || 11w½ || 3b1 || 2w0 || 19b0 || 22w½ || 78b1 || 15w0 || 28w½ || 34b0 || 5½ || 0 || 71 || 73,5 || 2367
|-
| 66. || align=left |  || 2374 || 121b1 || 62w1 || 8w½ || 2b0 || 107w1 || 15b½ || 3w½ || 37b0 || 55w½ || 72b½ || 32w0 || 5½ || 0 || 66 || 70 || 2314
|-
| 67. || align=left |  || 2257 || 20w½ || 13b½ || 43w1 || 14b0 || 46w½ || 44b½ || 103b1 || 34w0 || 77b1 || 29w0 || 74b½ || 5½ || 0 || 65,5 || 70,5 || 2357
|-
| 68. || align=left |  || 2261 || 12b½ || 21w½ || 80b1 || 70w½ || 34b1 || 16w0 || 36b0 || 24w0 || 121b1 || 74w½ || 77b½ || 5½ || 0 || 63,5 || 67,5 || 2379
|-
| 69. || align=left |  || 2297 || 127b1 || 50w½ || 74b1 || 7w½ || 10b0 || 12w½ || 92b½ || 22w½ || 24b0 || 99w½ || 79b½ || 5½ || 0 || 63,5 || 67,5 || 2299
|-
| 70. || align=left |  || 2376 || 110w1 || 87b½ || 98w½ || 68b½ || 41w1 || 3b½ || 49w0 || 55b½ || 32w1 || 20b0 || 27w0 || 5½ || 0 || 62 || 66,5 || 2281
|-
| 71. || align=left |  || 2222 || 16b1 || 33w½ || 77b0 || 53w1 || 42b½ || 36w½ || 34b½ || 48w0 || 89b0 || 108w1 || 76b½ || 5½ || 0 || 61 || 65,5 || 2331
|-
| 72. || align=left |  || 2262 || 31b0 || 124w1 || 21b½ || 78w½ || 103b1 || 24w½ || 53b½ || 33w0 || 80b1 || 66w½ || 42b0 || 5½ || 0 || 61 || 65 || 2329
|-
| 73. || align=left |  || 2308 || 134w1 || 47b½ || 2w0 || 87b½ || 98w1 || 40b½ || 37w0 || 96b1 || 18b0 || 75w1 || 28b0 || 5½ || 0 || 61 || 64,5 || 2268
|-
| 74. || align=left |  || 2395 || 98w½ || 117b1 || 69w0 || 64b1 || 30w1 || 20b0 || 97w1 || 17b0 || 38w0 || 68b½ || 67w½ || 5½ || 0 || 59,5 || 64,5 || 2280
|-
| 75. || align=left |  || 2227 || 11w0 || 134b1 || 57w½ || 44b1 || 37w0 || 30b0 || 100w1 || 58b1 || 78w0 || 73b0 || 114w1 || 5½ || 0 || 59,5 || 63 || 2277
|-
| 76. || align=left |  || 2274 || 5w0 || 129b1 || 103w1 || 40b½ || 23w0 || 57b0 || 110w1 || 82b½ || 90w1 || 52b0 || 71w½ || 5½ || 0 || 58,5 || 62,5 || 2241
|-
| 77. || align=left |  || 2378 || 113w1 || 99b½ || 71w1 || 8b½ || 11w0 || 55b0 || 96w½ || 102b½ || 67w0 || 110b1 || 68w½ || 5½ || 0 || 57 || 61,5 || 2250
|-
| 78. || align=left |  || 2420 || 90w½ || 101b½ || 55w½ || 72b½ || 102w1 || 39b½ || 89w½ || 65w0 || 75b1 || 45w0 || 81b½ || 5½ || 0 || 56 || 61 || 2263
|-
| 79. || align=left |  || 2069 || 114w1 || 20b0 || 38w½ || 30b0 || 97w0 || 85w1 || 91b0 || 109b1 || 83w½ || 101b1 || 69w½ || 5½ || 0 || 56 || 60,5 || 2287
|-
| 80. || align=left |  || 2443 || 64w1 || 27b0 || 68w0 || 104b1 || 55w0 || 99b½ || 107w1 || 81b½ || 72w0 || 93b1 || 56w½ || 5½ || 0 || 56 || 60,5 || 2220
|-
| 81. || align=left |  || 2261 || 49w0 || 125b1 || 13w0 || 100b1 || 87w0 || 113b1 || 90w½ || 80w½ || 92b1 || 44b0 || 78w½ || 5½ || 0 || 55,5 || 59,5 || 2278
|-
| 82. || align=left |  || 2110 || 57w½ || 44b0 || 37w0 || 120b½ || 138w1 || 84b1 || 95w½ || 76w½ || 62b0 || 96b1 || 83w½ || 5½ || 0 || 55,5 || 58,5 || 2248
|-
| 83. || align=left |  || 2267 || 1w0 || 131b1 || 6b0 || 110w0 || 119b1 || 130w½ || 121b1 || 31w0 || 79b½ || 104w1 || 82b½ || 5½ || 0 || 55 || 58,5 || 2194
|-
| 84. || align=left |  || 2257 || 6b0 || 132w1 || 16b0 || 121w1 || 31b0 || 82w0 || 137b0 || 138b1 || 111w½ || 119w1 || 112b1 || 5½ || 0 || 52,5 || 55,5 || 2154
|-
| 85. || align=left |  || 2202 || 23w½ || 40b0 || 139w1 || 95b0 || 61w0 || 79b0 || 128w1 || 100b½ || 120w½ || 111b1 || 116b1 || 5½ || 0 || 51,5 || 54,5 || 2125
|-
| 86. || align=left |  || 2253 || 13w½ || 43b½ || 46w1 || 15b0 || 57w½ || 95b½ || 61w0 || 104b1 || 44w0 || 103b1 || 58w0 || 5 || 0 || 62,5 || 67,5 || 2287
|-
| 87. || align=left |  || 2143 || 9b1 || 70w½ || 29b0 || 73w½ || 81b1 || 25w1 || 28b0 || 42w0 || 45b0 || 92w½ || 95b½ || 5 || 0 || 62 || 67 || 2315
|-
| 88. || align=left |  || 2343 || 125w1 || 2b½ || 20w0 || 99b1 || 49w0 || 110b1 || 46w½ || 43b0 || 56w½ || 32b0 || 91w½ || 5 || 0 || 61 || 65 || 2261
|-
| 89. || align=left |  || 2316 || 139w1 || 28b0 || 104w1 || 13b0 || 109w1 || 31w½ || 78b½ || 40b0 || 71w1 || 22b0 || 59w0 || 5 || 0 || 60,5 || 63,5 || 2253
|-
| 90. || align=left |  || 2212 || 78b½ || 7w0 || 119b1 || 35b½ || 60w1 || 42w0 || 81b½ || 45w½ || 76b0 || 106w1 || 62b0 || 5 || 0 || 60 || 64,5 || 2243
|-
| 91. || align=left |  || 2237 || 43w½ || 46b½ || 61w½ || 37b0 || 126w1 || 58b0 || 79w1 || 114b1 || 57w0 || 54b0 || 88b½ || 5 || 0 || 58,5 || 62,5 || 2296
|-
| 92. || align=left |  || 2389 || 104w½ || 111b1 || 97w1 || 5b0 || 94w1 || 13b0 || 69w½ || 41b0 || 81w0 || 87b½ || 102w½ || 5 || 0 || 57,5 || 62 || 2235
|-
| 93. || align=left |  || 2152 || 61w½ || 37b1 || 49w0 || 58b0 || 114w1 || 97b0 || 60w½ || 44b0 || 100w1 || 80w0 || 118b1 || 5 || 0 || 57 || 61 || 2285
|-
| 94. || align=left |  || 2287 || 128w1 || 34b0 || 115w1 || 16w½ || 92b0 || 43b0 || 126w1 || 101b1 || 46w0 || 58b½ || 64w0 || 5 || 0 || 57 || 60,5 || 2201
|-
| 95. || align=left |  || 2335 || 106b½ || 137w1 || 50b0 || 85w1 || 21b0 || 86w½ || 82b½ || 59w0 || 98w1 || 56b0 || 87w½ || 5 || 0 || 56 || 60,5 || 2164
|-
| 96. || align=left |  || 2247 || 21b½ || 12w0 || 108b1 || 23b0 || 99w½ || 122w1 || 77b½ || 73w0 || 119b½ || 82w0 || 121b1 || 5 || 0 || 56 || 60 || 2200
|-
| 97. || align=left |  || 2290 || 141b1 || 10w½ || 92b0 || 106w0 || 79b1 || 93w1 || 74b0 || 130w1 || 22b½ || 33w0 || 63b0 || 5 || 0 || 56 || 59 || 2159
|-
| 98. || align=left |  || 2132 || 74b½ || 24w1 || 70b½ || 36w0 || 73b0 || 60b½ || 38w0 || 124w1 || 95b0 || 120b½ || 129w1 || 5 || 0 || 55,5 || 59,5 || 2223
|-
| 99. || align=left |  || 2196 || 19b1 || 77w½ || 33b0 || 88w0 || 96b½ || 80w½ || 114w0 || 118b1 || 115w1 || 69b½ || 61w0 || 5 || 0 || 55 || 59 || 2274
|-
| 100. || align=left |  || 2054 || 53b0 || 19w0 || 140b1 || 81w0 || 63b1 || 59w½ || 75b0 || 85w½ || 93b0 || 127b1 || 123w1 || 5 || 0 || 54,5 || 57 || 2115
|-
| 101. || align=left |  || 2226 || 7b½ || 78w½ || 42b0 || 131w0 || 137b1 || 124w1 || 45b½ || 94w0 || 106b½ || 79w0 || 122b1 || 5 || 0 || 54 || 57,5 || 2140
|-
| 102. || align=left |  || 2240 || 50b0 || 142w1 || 19b0 || 137w1 || 78b0 || 121w½ || 132b1 || 77w½ || 25b0 || 112w½ || 92b½ || 5 || 0 || 53 || 55,5 || 2178
|-
| 103. || align=left |  || 1885 || 116b0 || 63w1 || 76b0 || 117b1 || 72w0 || 109b1 || 67w0 || 64b0 || 113w1 || 86w0 || 130b1 || 5 || 0 || 52 || 55,5 || 2190
|-
| 104. || align=left |  || 2111 || 92b½ || 36w½ || 89b0 || 80w0 || 125b½ || 141w1 || 62b½ || 86w0 || 131w1 || 83b0 || 120w1 || 5 || 0 || 50 || 53 || 2135
|-
| 105. || align=left |  || 2136 || 47w0 || 128b1 || 39w0 || 134b1 || 45w1 || 35b½ || 52w½ || 14b0 || 60w0 || 61b0 || 110w½ || 4½ || 0 || 59 || 62,5 || 2123
|-
| 106. || align=left |  || 1981 || 95w½ || 114b1 || 52w0 || 97b1 || 43w½ || 17b½ || 35w0 || 38b0 || 101w½ || 90b0 || 107w½ || 4½ || 0 || 57 || 61,5 || 2246
|-
| 107. || align=left |  || 2180 || 40w½ || 61b½ || 116b1 || 42w½ || 66b0 || 53w0 || 80b0 || 108w0 || 125b1 || 118w½ || 106b½ || 4½ || 0 || 53,5 || 57,5 || 2184
|-
| 108. || align=left |  || 2052 || 44w½ || 35b0 || 96w0 || 129b1 || 38w0 || 114b0 || 141w1 || 107b1 || 64w½ || 71b0 || 109w½ || 4½ || 0 || 53,5 || 56,5 || 2119
|-
| 109. || align=left |  || 2213 || 46w½ || 15b½ || 25b0 || 125w1 || 89b0 || 103w0 || 124b½ || 79w0 || 132b1 || 121w½ || 108b½ || 4½ || 0 || 53 || 56,5 || 2077
|-
| 110. || align=left |  || 2089 || 70b0 || 16w0 || 142b1 || 83b1 || 62w½ || 88w0 || 76b0 || 125w1 || 116b½ || 77w0 || 105b½ || 4½ || 0 || 53 || 55,5 || 2171
|-
| 111. || align=left |  || 2071 || 29b½ || 92w0 || 24b0 || 127w½ || 140b1 || 56b0 || 138w1 || 62w0 || 84b½ || 85w0 || 132b1 || 4½ || 0 || 52 || 54,5 || 2058
|-
| 112. || align=left |  || 2093 || 52w0 || 143b1 || 23w0 || 114b½ || 44w0 || 125b0 || 127w1 || 131b½ || 129w1 || 102b½ || 84w0 || 4½ || 0 || 50 || 52 || 2023
|-
| 113. || align=left |  || 2091 || 77b0 || 144w1 || 62b0 || 116w1 || 53b0 || 81w0 || 143b1 || 63w0 || 103b0 || 124w1 || 117b½ || 4½ || 0 || 49,5 || 50 || 1983
|-
| 114. || align=left |  || 2370 || 79b0 || 106w0 || 138b1 || 112w½ || 93b0 || 108w1 || 99b1 || 91w0 || 51b0 || 130w1 || 75b0 || 4½ || 0 || 49 || 52 || 2046
|-
| 115. || align=left |  || 2093 || 33b0 || 136w1 || 94b0 || 46b0 || 142w1 || 45w0 || 131b½ || 132w1 || 99b0 || 116w0 || 134b1 || 4½ || 0 || 47,5 || 50 || 2013
|-
| 116. || align=left |  || 2330 || 103w1 || 3b0 || 107w0 || 113b0 || 118w0 || 138b0 || 139w1 || 128b1 || 110w½ || 115b1 || 85w0 || 4½ || 0 || 47 || 50 || 1952
|-
| 117. || align=left |  || 2208 || 24b½ || 74w0 || 137b½ || 103w0 || 124b0 || 132w0 || 0 || 136b1 || 128w1 || 131b1 || 113w½ || 4½ || 0 || 45,5 || 48,5 || 1942
|-
| 118. || align=left |  || 2049 || 42b0 || 9w0 || 127b½ || 141w1 || 116b1 || 54w0 || 59b0 || 99w0 || 133w1 || 107b½ || 93w0 || 4 || 0 || 52,5 || 55,5 || 2005
|-
| 119. || align=left |  || 2049 || 35w½ || 14b0 || 90w0 || 139b½ || 83w0 || 134b1 || 133w½ || 126b1 || 96w½ || 84b0 || 0 || 4 || 0 || 51 || 54 || 2042
|-
| 120. || align=left |  || 2035 || 36b½ || 29w0 || 59b0 || 82w½ || 130b0 || 140w1 || 122b0 || 135w1 || 85b½ || 98w½ || 104b0 || 4 || 0 || 51 || 53,5 || 1994
|-
| 121. || align=left |  || 2072 || 66w0 || 38b0 || 135w1 || 84b0 || 134w1 || 102b½ || 83w0 || 133b1 || 68w0 || 109b½ || 96w0 || 4 || 0 || 50 || 53,5 || 2012
|-
| 122. || align=left |  || 2090 || 34w0 || 41b0 || 134w0 || 128b1 || 139w1 || 96b0 || 120w1 || 60b0 || 123w1 || 64b0 || 101w0 || 4 || 0 || 50 || 53 || 1980
|-
| 123. || align=left |  || 2223 || 28w0 || 135b1 || 36b0 || 132w½ || 133b½ || 131w1 || 41b0 || 25w0 || 122b0 || 134w1 || 100b0 || 4 || 0 || 49,5 || 53 || 1957
|-
| 124. || align=left |  || 2000 || 60w0 || 72b0 || 128w1 || 56b0 || 117w1 || 101b0 || 109w½ || 98b0 || 127w½ || 113b0 || 141w1 || 4 || 0 || 49 || 52 || 1934
|-
| 125. || align=left |  || 1987 || 88b0 || 81w0 || 144b1 || 109b0 || 104w½ || 112w1 || 63b0 || 110b0 || 107w0 || 135w½ || 139b1 || 4 || 0 || 46 || 46,5 || 1912
|-
| 126. || align=left |  || 2168 || 22b0 || 141w1 || 54b0 || 133w½ || 91b0 || 127w1 || 94b0 || 119w0 || 134b0 || 138b½ || 140w1 || 4 || 0 || 44,5 || 47 || 1859
|-
| 127. || align=left |  || 1619 || 69w0 || 64b0 || 118w½ || 111b½ || 129w½ || 126b0 || 112b0 || 142w1 || 124b½ || 100w0 || 143b1 || 4 || 0 || 44 || 46 || 1907
|-
| 128. || align=left |  || 1498 || 94b0 || 105w0 || 124b0 || 122w0 || 144w1 || 129b1 || 85b0 || 116w0 || 117b0 || -1 || 138w1 || 4 || 0 || 42 || 42,5 || 1888
|-
| 129. || align=left |  || 2011 || 48b0 || 76w0 || 141b½ || 108w0 || 127b½ || 128w0 || 140b1 || 143w1 || 112b0 || 139w1 || 98b0 || 4 || 0 || 41,5 || 43,5 || 1753
|-
| 130. || align=left |  || 2122 || 37w½ || 57b½ || 41w0 || 43b0 || 120w1 || 83b½ || 64w1 || 97b0 || 58w0 || 114b0 || 103w0 || 3½ || 0 || 57,5 || 61,5 || 2131
|-
| 131. || align=left |  || 1990 || 25b0 || 83w0 || 136b1 || 101b1 || 39w0 || 123b0 || 115w½ || 112w½ || 104b0 || 117w0 || 135b½ || 3½ || 0 || 50,5 || 53,5 || 1955
|-
| 132. || align=left |  || 1990 || 17w0 || 84b0 || 143w1 || 123b½ || 64w0 || 117b1 || 102w0 || 115b0 || 109w0 || 133b1 || 111w0 || 3½ || 0 || 49,5 || 51,5 || 1963
|-
| 133. || align=left |  || 1829 || 54b0 || 32w0 || 63b1 || 126b½ || 123w½ || 51w0 || 119b½ || 121w0 || 118b0 || 132w0 || 144w1 || 3½ || 0 || 48,5 || 49 || 1940
|-
| 134. || align=left |  || 1673 || 73b0 || 75w0 || 122b1 || 105w0 || 121b0 || 119w0 || 142b½ || 141b1 || 126w1 || 123b0 || 115w0 || 3½ || 0 || 43,5 || 46 || 1932
|-
| 135. || align=left |  || 1619 || 45b0 || 123w0 || 121b0 || 63w0 || 141b0 || 136w1 || 144w1 || 120b0 || 138w½ || 125b½ || 131w½ || 3½ || 0 || 41 || 41,5 || 1777
|-
| 136. || align=left |  || 1496 || 27w0 || 115b0 || 131w0 || 138w0 || 143b0 || 135b0 || -1 || 117w0 || 144b1 || 141b½ || 142w1 || 3½ || 0 || 35,5 || 36 || 1606
|-
| 137. || align=left |  || 2016 || 14w½ || 95b0 || 117w½ || 102b0 || 101w0 || 139b1 || 84w1 || 0 || 0 || 0 || 0 || 3 || 0 || 52 || 55 || 2149
|-
| 138. || align=left |  || 1881 || 58w0 || 55b0 || 114w0 || 136b1 || 82b0 || 116w1 || 111b0 || 84w0 || 135b½ || 126w½ || 128b0 || 3 || 0 || 47,5 || 50,5 || 1870
|-
| 139. || align=left |  || 1771 || 89b0 || 59w½ || 85b0 || 119w½ || 122b0 || 137w0 || 116b0 || 140w1 || 143b1 || 129b0 || 125w0 || 3 || 0 || 45 || 47 || 1851
|-
| 140. || align=left |  || 1716 || 30w0 || 56b0 || 100w0 || 144b1 || 111w0 || 120b0 || 129w0 || 139b0 || -1 || 143w1 || 126b0 || 3 || 0 || 41 || 41,5 || 1682
|-
| 141. || align=left |  || 1560 || 97w0 || 126b0 || 129w½ || 118b0 || 135w1 || 104b0 || 108b0 || 134w0 || 142b1 || 136w½ || 124b0 || 3 || 0 || 40,5 || 43 || 1758
|-
| 142. || align=left |  || 1792 || 65w0 || 102b0 || 110w0 || 143b1 || 115b0 || 63w0 || 134w½ || 127b0 || 141w0 || 144w1 || 136b0 || 2½ || 0 || 41 || 41,5 || 1598
|-
| 143. || align=left |  || 1340 || 62b0 || 112w0 || 132b0 || 142w0 || 136w1 || 144b1 || 113w0 || 129b0 || 139w0 || 140b0 || 127w0 || 2 || 0 || 37,5 || 38 || 1564
|-
| 144. || align=left |  || 1223 || 39w0 || 113b0 || 125w0 || 140w0 || 128b0 || 143w0 || 135b0 || -1 || 136w0 || 142b0 || 133b0 || 1 || 0 || 35,5 || 37 || 965
|}

References

External links
  Women's European Individual Chess Championship 2017 home page 
  Women's European Individual Chess Championship 2017 in chess-results.com
  Women's European Individual Chess Championship 2017 in chessgames.com

2017
2017 in chess
Sports competitions in Riga
2017 in Latvian sport
Chess in Latvia
International sports competitions hosted by Latvia
April 2017 sports events in Europe
Women's chess competitions